The XL Ranch is an Indian reservation located in Modoc County, north of Burney, California.

It is home to the Hewisedawi band of the Pit River Tribe, a federally recognized tribe, which includes 9 bands of Achomawi Indians and 2 bands of Atsugewi Indians.

The XL Ranch is sometimes known as XL Rancheria, XL Ranch Indian Reservation, or X-L Ranch Reservation.

Approximately 40 tribal members live on the reservation.

Language
The band traditionally spoke the Achumawi and Atsugewi languages, which are closely related.  They are part of the Palaihnihan branch of the Hokan language family. Some members of XL Ranch speak the Northern Paiute language, a Western Numic language of the Uto-Aztecan language family.

Today
The Pit River Indian Tribe is headquartered in Burney, California.

Tribal members often find employment in logging and hay ranching.

In 2015, federal agents busted a large marijuana grow.  The grow had been started in partnership with a Canadian company, but was disputed between the two direct descendants of the Pit River tribe, siblings Phillip Del Rosa and Wendy Del Rosa.

Notes

References
 Pritzker, Barry M. A Native American Encyclopedia: History, Culture, and Peoples. Oxford: Oxford University Press, 2000. .

Pit River tribes
American Indian reservations in California
Geography of Modoc County, California
Native American tribes in California
Federally recognized tribes in the United States
1938 establishments in California